Kyperounda Stadium is a football stadium in Kyperounta, Cyprus.  It is currently used mostly for football matches and is the home ground of APEP Pitsilia of the Cypriot Third Division.  The stadium has a capacity of 6,000 spectators.

External links
 Stadium information

Football venues in Cyprus
APEP FC
Buildings and structures in Limassol District